Texas Shootout is a casino poker game based on Texas hold 'em developed by Galaxy Gaming. It is available in Las Vegas, and a number of smaller casinos in the U.S.

Rules
Texas Holdem Shootout is one of the more complicated ways to play poker. A shootout poker tournament is a knockout card game combining both the multi-table tournament with some sit-and-go poker strategy. Each player in the tournaments takes their chip count through the next table, so folding into a money advantage in the early stages of the game is not an option. Unlike in cash games, winners in Texas hold 'em poker tournaments must sit through the contest to the end or until they are eliminated.

All players in the shootout poker tournament start with an equal number of chips and must pay equal buy-in cash. Prizes will be won at various stages of the tournament, and this goes on until only one player is left. The last standing player is the overall winner in the tournament, and he/she receives the top prize alongside other prizes won in the earlier knockout rounds.

In other poker tournaments, all the tables are regularly balanced throughout the elimination period. The qualifiers from different tables come together to form the final table and play through the round to determine the overall winner. In a Texas Shootout game, a player retains his table until he/she eliminates all the other players.
Once you have proved yourself in the first round, you are joined by other winners in another round of the shootout. These rounds could stretch from double to triple to quadruple, depending on the game's initial structure.

Method of play
The game is played with six decks of the standard 52 cards. A player places a bet and can also make an optional side bet. The player receives four cards (as does the dealer) from which he chooses the best two. The player may also use all four cards to make two separate hands, but must match (double) the amount bet. The dealer picks two of his cards according to a set procedure. Five community cards are dealt face up; the players and the dealer make the best five card poker hand from the community cards and their own two cards. If the player has a better hand than the dealer, he is paid even money on his bet. If he ties or has a worse hand, he loses his bet.

The side bet is based solely on the player's hand. If it is a straight or better, the player is paid. Stronger hands are paid multiples of the side bet; for example, a royal flush may be paid from 200 to 500 times the original side bet, depending on the pay structure chosen by the casino. The best possible hand is five of a kind in the same suit, for which the payout is 1000 to 5000 times. Three of a kind may result in a push (a draw) or the player losing, depending on the casino.

In addition, if the player places a minimum $5 side bet, they may be entitled to an "envy bonus". If any other player gets five of a kind (not of the same suit) or better, the player will receive a set amount as well, from $10 up to $1000 (for five of a kind of the same suit).

Hand rankings
The hands are ranked the same as regular poker, with the exception (due to the six decks used) of five of a kind. Five of a kind of different suits ranks above four of a kind, but below a straight flush, while five of a kind of the same suit is the best possible hand, beating even a royal flush.

Analysis
According to the Wizard of Odds website, the main bet results in a 2.7% edge for the house over the player. The side bet gives the house an advantage of between 7.2% and 19.8% for one player, but each additional player increases the possibility of receiving an envy bonus, reducing the house edge down to between 2.09% and 14.57% with a full table of seven players.

References

External links
Galaxy Gaming Texas Shootout

Gambling games
Texas hold 'em